Svitlana Viktorivna Ischenko (born July 30, 1969, Mykolaiv, Ukraine) — poet, translator, stage actress, teacher, artist.
She is a member of The Ukrainian Writers’ Association (1997) and The National Writers' Union of Ukraine (1998).

Biography 
Svitlana Ischenko was born on July 30, 1969 in Mykolaiv, in the steppe region of the south of Ukraine.

She graduated from Mykolaiv public school number 38. Svetlana pursued her childhood love of music at the Mykolaiv Rimsky-Korsakov Music School, and graduated in piano in 1986. She received a College Diploma in Acting, Stage Directing and Visual Art from the Mykolaiv State College of Culture in 1988. She later attended the Mykolaiv Branch of the Kyiv State University of Culture and Arts and received a BA in Recreation Management and Pedagogy in 1998.

For several years (1988–2001), Ischenko was a stage actress at the Mykolaiv Ukrainian Theatre of Drama and Musical Comedy. She played a number of significant characters from classic Ukrainian and European plays, among them Marusia (Marusia Churai by Lina Kostenko), Catherine (Catherine by Taras Shevchenko), Motrya (Kaydash's Family by Ivan Nechuy-Levytsky), Yaryna (Where There are people, There is Sin by І. Tobilevych), Ryna (Myna Mazaylo by Mykola Kulish), Prince (Dregs by Janusz Glovatsky), Julie (The Family Weekend by Jean Poiret), and Countess Rosina (Marriage of Figaro by P. Beaumarchais). Svitlana also created many poetic texts and songs for thematic programs, plays and musical shows for the Mykolaiv Ukrainian Theatre of Drama and Musical Comedy.

A number of Ukrainian composers and singers have created songs using Ischenko's poetry for lyrics—Viktor Ures, Viktor Piatygorsky, Oleksandr Nezhyhai, Olena Nikishenko, Oleksandr Honcharenko, Anna Oliynykova, and others.

In 2001, Ischenko immigrated to Canada. She lives in North Vancouver, British Columbia. Svitlana continues to keep in close contact with Ukraine. She writes in Ukrainian and English. Her literary achievement includes translations. Svitlana Ischenko is a co-translator of English versions of poetry by Dmytro Kremin, winner of the Taras Shevchenko Ukrainian National Literary Prize.

Ischenko's field of work in Canada is creating and teaching children's programs in visual arts, ballet, creative dance, Jazz, hip-hop, and musical theatre at Recreational Centres in North Vancouver. She has given poetry readings at the Vancouver Public Library in the “World Poetry Reading Series” and radio interviews on Vancouver's Co-op Radio as well as Voice of America (“Musical Rainbow” by Alexandr Kaganovsky) in the U.S.

Publications 
Ischenko's poems were first published in the Mykolaiv regional newspaper The Soviet Prybuzhia on December 14, 1991. 
Svitlana's literary work has appeared widely in a variety of publications in Ukraine, including magazines such as Dzvin (Lviv), Kyiv (Kyiv), Gorozhanin (Mykolaiv), Dyvoslovo (Kyiv), Art-Line (Kyiv), Vitchyzna (Kyiv), Kurier Kryvbasu (Kryviy Rih), and Vezha (Kropyvnytskyi), almanacs such as Borviy (Mykolaiv), Buzsky Gard (Mykolaiv), and Osvityanski vitryla (Mykolaiv), and in poetry anthologies such as Pochatki (Kyiv, Smoloskyp Press, 1998) and The Mykolaiv Oberih (Mykolaiv, Mozhlyvosti Kimmerii Press, 2004).
Svetlana's poems have also been published in Canadian literary magazines such as The Antigonish Review (Antigonish, Nova Scotia), Lichen (Whitby, Ontario), Event (Vancouver, British Columbia), and in poetic anthologies such as From This New World (Vancouver, Canada, 2003) and Che Wach Choe—Let the Delirium Begin (Lantzville, British Columbia, 2003).

Ischenko's co-translations of the poetry of Dmytro Kremin, winner of the Taras Shevchenko Ukrainian National Literary Prize, have appeared in well-known literary magazines such as London Magazine (London, England, 2007), Prism International (Vancouver, Canada, 2007), and Hayden’s Ferry Review (Arizona, US, 2009), in the trilingual collection Two Shores (Mykolaiv, Iryna Hudym Publisher, 2007) and in the book Poems From The Scythian Wild Field (Ekstasis Editions, Victoria, B.C., Canada, 2016) -- a selection of the poetry of Dmytro Kremin translated into English by Svitlana Ischenko and Russell Thornton

Books of poetry 
 1995 Chorals of the Earth and Sky (Kyiv, Ukrainian Writer—Vyr Press), including A Crane’s Cry, a dramatic play based on the novel by Roman Ivanychuk
 1998 B-Sharp (Mykolaiv, Mozhlyvosti Kimmerii)
 2001 After the Song of Solomon (Vancouver, Canada)
 2005 In the Mornings I Find a Crane’s Feathers in My Damp Braids (Leaf Press, Lantzville, Canada)
 2006 The Rain Dance of Dana (Marigold Publications, Vancouver, Canada)
 2019 The Trees Have Flown Up In Couples (Mykolaiv, Viktor Shvets Publishing House)

Works of translation 
From Ukrainian into English
 Dmytro Kremin The Horse Constellation (magazine The Malahat Review, issue 188, Victoria, B.C., Canada, 2014), The Lost Manuscript (magazine The London Magazine, issue June–July 2007, London, England), Don Quixote From the Estuary (magazine Prism International, issue 45:4, Summer 2007, Vancouver, Canada), The Tower of Pisa, The Tendra Mustungs' Odyssey, Wild Honey, A Church in the Middle of the Universe, Christmas in Bohopil, The Hunt For the Wild Boar (magazine Hayden's Ferry Review, issue 44, spring-summer 2009, Virginia, Arizona, USA).
 Poems From The Scythian Wild Field (Ekstasis Editions, Victoria, B.C., Canada, 2016) -- a selection of the poetry of Dmytro Kremin translated into English by Svetlana Ischenko and Russell Thornton
 Poems in Response to Peril -- Anthology in Support of Ukraine published two poems by Dmytro Kremin The Ashes of an Eyewitness and The Lost Manuscript translated into English by Svetlana Ischenko and Russell Thornton (Pendas Productions/Laughing Raven Press, London, Ontario, Canada, 2022)
 Dmytro Kremin The Lost Manuscript (magazine The Walrus, issue June 2022, Toronto, Canada)

From Russian into Ukrainian
 Sergei Yesenin Persian Motives in the book B-Sharp (Mykolaiv, "Можливості Кіммерії", 1998)
 Alexandr Pushkin To the Fountain of the Bakhchisaray Palace in the book The Trees Have Flown Up In Couples (Mykolaiv, «Видавництво Віктора Швеця», 2019)
 Larisa Маtveyevа (selected poems) in the book The Trees Have Flown Up In Couples (Mykolaiv, «Видавництво Віктора Швеця», 2019)

From English into Ukrainian
 Elizabeth Bachinsky in Elizabeth Bachinsky (Canada) -- Selected Poems translated by Svetlana Ischenko (magazine Sobornist, issue 1-2, 2014, Israel)
 Leonard Cohen, Margaret Atwood, Alden Nowlan, Russell Thornton, Tim Bowling, Gwendolyn MacEwen, Irving Layton in Variations on the Word Love: Anthology of Canadian Poets (magazine Kyiv, issue 7-8, 2017, Ukraine)
 Russell Thornton in Russell Thornton: Poetry (magazine "Sobornist", Israel, 2015)
 Irving Layton, Russell Thornton, Tim Bowling in Canadian Poetry translated by Svetlana Ischenko (magazine "Soborna Vulytsia" (Cathedral Street), Mykolaiv, December, 2017)

Awards 
 in Ukraine: The New Names of Ukraine and The Golden Harp, 1995
 in Canada: Burnaby Writers’ Society Poetry Contest, 2003
 in Israel: The International Literary Prize of Ivan Koshelivets, 2013
 in Ukraine: The Best Mykolaiv Book of the Year 2019 in Poetry nomination: Svetlana Ischenko The Trees Have Flown Up In Couples, 2019

References

Sources and external links 
 Svetlana Ischenko's poetry
 Poetry in internet-magazine The Literary Mykolaiv
 Songs using Svetlana Ischenko’s poetry for lyrics available in internet-magazine The Literary Mykolaiv
 Poetry, songs, biography on web-portal Zhinka-Ukrainka
 Photo Gallery on web-portal Zhinka-Ukrainka
 Paintings by Svetlana Ischenko
 Poems From The Scythian Wild Field (a selection of the poetry of Dmytro Kremin translated from Ukrainian by Svetlana Ischenko and Russell Thornton) 
 Poetry in Vitchyzna magazine issue 1-2, 2007
 Poetry on Bukvoyid website 
 Three sonnets from a crown of sonnets “A Woman” on Bukvoid website 
 Poetry After the Song of Solomon on Dotyk Slovom website
 Dmytro Kremin re: Svetlana Ischenko (video) on internet magazine The Literary Mykolaiv issue 4 – 2012 
 Personal thanks to a Poet -- Dmytro Kremin, an article on the 60th birthday of the poet D. Kremin 
 Entry in Mykolaiv Regional Viktor Liagin Library for children website 
 Poem on Leaf Press, Canada website 
 Information on chapbook on Leaf Press, Canada website 
 Interview with S. Ischenko by Inna Bereza, “A Dialogue with a Compatriot” in Prosvita Khersonschyny—Visnyk Tavriyskoyi Fundatsiyi, issue 4, 2007 
 Mykolaiv Scientific-Pedagogic Library: Svetlana Ischenko -- Biography
 Entry in Mykolaiv Central Marko Kropyvnytskyi Library website
 Interview with Svetlana Ischenko, TV channel "Mykolaiv", Ukraine, June 23, 2017
 "Poems From the Scythian Wild Field" -- poetry readings at the Marko Kropyvnytskyi Library, TV channel "Mykolaiv, Ukraine June 23, 2017
 Video and photos from the poetry readings by Dmytro Kremin and Svetlana Ischenko at the Marko Kropyvnytskyi Library, Mykolaiv, Ukraine, June 23, 2017
 Paintings by Svetlana Ischenko gifted by the author to the Marko Kropyvnytskyi Library, Mykolaiv, Ukraine
 
 
 
 
 
 Canadian Literary Magazine "The Walrus", June 2022: Dmytro Kremin "The Lost Manuscript" translated by Svetlana Ischenko and Russell Thornton

1969 births
Living people
Actors from Mykolaiv
Ukrainian women poets
20th-century Ukrainian poets
20th-century Ukrainian women writers
21st-century Ukrainian poets
21st-century Ukrainian women writers
21st-century Ukrainian writers
Writers from Mykolaiv